Mannosyl-oligosaccharide 1,2-alpha-mannosidase IB is an enzyme that in humans is encoded by the MAN1A2 gene.

References

Further reading